Estádio da Fazendinha is a sports stadium in Ituiutaba, Brazil. It has a maximum capacity of 3,840 people.

It is the home of Ituiutaba Esporte Clube.

References

External links
 Estádio da Fazendinha at Templos do Futebol

Football venues in Minas Gerais